Good Night Elmer is a 1940 Warner Bros. Merrie Melodies cartoon short, directed by Chuck Jones, animated by Phil Monroe and written by Rich Hogan. The short was released on October 26, 1940 and features Elmer Fudd.

Plot
The cartoon depicts ill-fated attempts by Elmer, in a rare leading role, to extinguish a candle by his bedside so that he can retire for the night, with the flame always surging again in spite of Elmer's best efforts. Elmer finally succeeds, but only at the expense of wrecking his bedroom in the process, and no sooner than he lies down, the sun comes up, precipitating a nervous breakdown in Elmer Fudd, who starts weeping, bawling, and crying.

Reception 
Good Night Elmer was produced around the time Chuck Jones was directing cartoons that bear similarities towards those made by Disney and Harman and Ising. In retrospect, the short was derided by critics and animation enthusiasts, particularly for its dull pacing an noticeable lack of comedy. A review from the Motion Picture Herald in 1942 called the cartoon a "Very poor reel. Not up to standard." Animation historians Jerry Beck and Will Friedwald also called the short "one of the most irritating cartoons ever made." in there book Looney Tunes and Merrie Melodies: A Complete Illustrated Guide to the Warner Bros. Cartoons.

Beck again discussed the cartoon on his website, Cartoon Research, in a post about his least favorite Warner Bros. shorts. He would state:"BOR-ring! One of the slowest moving animated shorts I’ve ever seen. First he can’t take off his jacket. Then he can’t blow out the candle. The character [Elmer] is so stupid its painful. The short ends with him crying in frustration (something we in the audience can identify with).

It’s the equivalent of an Edgar Kennedy live action comedy short… only without the humor, the pacing… or Edgar Kennedy. The animation is beautiful, but there is nothing – I repeat nothing – in this film that couldn’t have been done in live action. A depressing film – far opposite of what Jones would start producing in a year or two."

See also
 Looney Tunes and Merrie Melodies filmography (1940–1949)

References

External links

Good Night Elmer at the Big Cartoon DataBase
 Watch Good Night Elmer here

1940 films
1940 comedy films
1940 animated films
1940s Warner Bros. animated short films
Merrie Melodies short films
Elmer Fudd films
Night in culture
Animated films without speech
Short films directed by Chuck Jones
Films scored by Carl Stalling
1940s English-language films